Claude Simon (10 October 1913 – 6 July 2005) was a French novelist, and was awarded the 1985 Nobel Prize in Literature.

Biography 
Claude Simon was born in Tananarive on the isle of Madagascar. His parents were French, his father being a career officer who was killed in the First World War. He grew up with his mother and her family in Perpignan in the middle of the wine district of Roussillon. 
Among his ancestors was a general from the time of the French Revolution.

After secondary school at Collège Stanislas in Paris and brief sojourns at Oxford and Cambridge he took courses in painting at the André Lhote Academy. He then travelled extensively through Spain, Germany, the Soviet Union, Italy and Greece. This experience as well as those from the Second World War show up in his literary work. At the beginning of the war Claude Simon took part in the battle of the Meuse (1940) and was taken prisoner. He managed to escape and joined the resistance movement. At the same time he completed his first novel, Le Tricheur ("The Cheat", published in 1946), which he had started to write before the war.

He lived in Paris and used to spend part of the year at Salses in the Pyrenees.

In 1960, he was a signatory to the Manifesto of the 121 in favor of Algerian independence. In 1961 Claude Simon received the prize of L'Express for La Route des Flandres and in 1967 the Médicis prize for Histoire. The University of East Anglia made him honorary doctor in 1973.

Novels 
Much of Claude Simon's writing is autobiograpichal dealing with personal experiences from World War II and the Spanish Civil War, and his family history. His early novels are largely traditional in form, but with Le vent (1957) and L'Herbe (1958) he developed a style associated with the Nouveau roman. La Route de Flandres (1960), that tells about wartime experiences, earned him the L'Express prize and international recognition. In Triptyque (1973) three different stories are mixed together without paragraph breaks. The novels Histoire (1967), Les Géorgiques (1981) and L'Acacia (1989) are largely about Simon's family history.

Style and influences 
Simon is often identified with the nouveau roman movement exemplified in the works of Alain Robbe-Grillet and Michel Butor, and while his fragmented narratives certainly contain some of the formal disruption characteristic of that movement (in particular Histoire, 1967, and Triptyque, 1973), he nevertheless retains a strong sense of narrative and character.

In fact, Simon arguably has much more in common with his Modernist predecessors than with his contemporaries; in particular, the works of Marcel Proust and William Faulkner are a clear influence. Simon's use of self-consciously long sentences (often stretching across many pages and with parentheses sometimes interrupting a clause which is only completed pages later) can be seen to reference Proust's style, and Simon moreover makes use of certain Proustian settings (in La Route des Flandres, for example, the narrator's captain de Reixach is shot by a sniper concealed behind a hawthorn hedge or haie d'aubépines, a reference to the meeting between Gilberte and the narrator across a hawthorn hedge in Proust's À la recherche du temps perdu).

The Faulknerian influence is evident in the novels' extensive use of a fractured timeline with frequent and potentially disorienting analepsis (moments of chronological discontinuity), and of an extreme form of free indirect speech in which narrative voices (often unidentified) and streams of consciousness bleed into the words of the narrator. The ghost of Faulkner looms particularly large in 1989's L'Acacia, which uses a number of non-sequential calendar dates covering a wide chronological period in lieu of chapter headings, a device borrowed from Faulkner's The Sound and the Fury.

Themes 
Despite these influences, Simon's work is thematically and stylistically highly original. War is a constant and central theme (indeed it is present in one form or another in almost all of Simon's published works), and Simon often contrasts various individuals' experiences of different historical conflicts in a single novel; World War I and the Second World War in L'Acacia (which also takes into account the impact of war on the widows of soldiers), the French Revolutionary Wars and the Second World War in Les Géorgiques.

In addition, many of the novels deal with the notion of family history, those myths and legends which are passed down through generations and which conspire in Simon's work to affect the protagonists' lives. In this regard, the novels make use of a number of leitmotifs which recur in different combinations between novels (a technique also employed by Marguerite Duras), in particular the suicide of an eighteenth-century ancestor and the death of a contemporary relative by sniper-fire. Finally, almost all of Simon's novels feature horses; Simon was himself an accomplished equestrian, and fought in a mounted regiment during World War II (the ridiculousness of mounted soldiers fighting in a mechanised war is a major theme of La Route des Flandres and Les Géorgiques).

Simon's principal obsession, however, is with the ways in which humans experience time (another Modernist fascination). The novels often dwell on images of old-age, such as the decaying 'LSM' or the old woman (that 'flaccid and ectoplasmic Cassandra') in Les Géorgiques, which are frequently seen through the uncomprehending eyes of childhood. Simon's use of family history equally attempts to show how individuals exist in history—that is, how they might feel implicated in the lives and stories of their ancestors who died long ago.

Seminars

Jean Ricardou (Director) :
 Nouveau roman : hier, aujourd'hui, Cerisy (France), 1971.
 Claude Simon : analyse, théorie, Cerisy (France), 1974.
 Pour une théorie matérialiste du texte, Cerisy (France), 1980.

Criticism
Essayist Christopher Hitchens criticised Simon's deconstruction of George Orwell's account of the Spanish Civil War, claiming that Simon had himself fought "on the side of the Stalintern forces."  In a further reference to the literary honours bestowed on Simon, Hitchens added: "the award of the Nobel Prize to such a shady literary enterprise is a minor scandal, reflecting the intellectual rot which had been spread by pseudo intellectuals."

Works 
 Le Tricheur (The Cheat) 1946
 La Corde Raide (The Tightrope) 1947
 Gulliver 1952
 Le Sacre du printemps (The Rite of Spring) 1954
 Le vent: Tentative de restitution d 'un rétable baroque (The Wind: Attempted Restoration of a Baroque Altarpiece) 1957
 L'Herbe (The Grass) 1958
 La Route des Flandres (The Flanders Road) 1960
 Le Palace (The Palace) 1962
 La Separation (The Separation) 1963; play, adapted from the novel L'Herbe
 Femmes, sur 23 peintures de Joan Miró (Women, on 23 paintings by Joan Miró) 1966; new edition, La Chevelure de Bérénice (Berenice's Hair) 1984
 Histoire (Story) 1967
 La Bataille de Pharsale (The Battle of Pharsalus) 1969
 Orion aveugle: Essai (Blind Orion: Essay) 1970
 Les Corps conducteurs (Conducting Bodies) 1971
 Triptyque (Triptych) 1973
 Leçon de choses (Lesson in Things) 1975
 Les Géorgiques (The Georgics) 1981
 L'Invitation (The Invitation) 1987
 L'Acacia (The Acacia) 1989
 Le jardin des plantes (The Garden of Plants) 1997
 Le tramway (The Trolley) 2001

Collected edition
Œuvres (Bibliothèque de la Pléiade):
 Tome I (Gallimard, 2006), including Le Vent: Tentative de restitution d'un retable baroque, La Route des Flandres, Le Palace, La Bataille de Pharsale, La Chevelure de Bérénice (Reprise du texte Femmes), Triptyque, Le Jardin des Plantes, and other writings.
 Tome II (Gallimard, 2013), including L'Herbe, Histoire, Les Corps conducteurs, Leçon de choses, Les Géorgiques, L'Invitation, L'Acacia, Le Tramway, and other writings.

References

Further reading
 Brigitte Ferrato-Combe, Ecrire en peintre: Claude Simon et la peinture, ELLUG, Grenoble 1998
 Bernard Luscans, La représentation dans le nouveau nouveau roman, Chapel Hill, Université de Caroline du Nord, 2008.
 Mireille Calle-Gruber, Claude Simon, une vie à écrire, Paris, Ed. du Seuil, 2011.
 Karen L. Gould, Claude Simon's Mythic Muse, French Literature Publications, 1979. 
 Karen L. Gould and  R. Birn (Editors), Orion Blinded: Essays on Claude Simon, Bucknell University Press, 1981.
 Ilias Yocaris, L’impossible totalité. Une étude de la complexité dans l’œuvre de Claude Simon, http://revel.unice.fr/loxias/index.html?id=107, Toronto, Paratexte, 2002.
 Ilias Yocaris : « Vers un nouveau langage romanesque : le collage citationnel dans La Bataille de Pharsale de Claude Simon », Revue Romane, 43, 2, 2008, p. 303–327.
 Ilias Yocaris & David Zemmour : « Qu’est-ce qu’une fiction cubiste ? La "construction textuelle du point de vue" dans L’Herbe et La Route des Flandres », Semiotica, 195, 2013, p. 1-44, https://www.linguistiquefrancaise.org/articles/cmlf/pdf/2010/01/cmlf2010_000086.pdf

External links

 About Claude Simon
 Association des Lecteurs de Claude Simon (ALCS) website for readers of Claude Simon (articles in french and in english) 
 
 
 

1913 births
2005 deaths
Burials at Montmartre Cemetery
French Nobel laureates
Nobel laureates in Literature
People from Antananarivo
Prix Médicis winners
French Resistance members
Collège Stanislas de Paris alumni
Lycée Saint-Louis alumni
French male novelists
20th-century French novelists
French expatriates in Madagascar